The 3 Seventh Avenue Express is a rapid transit service in the A Division of the New York City Subway. Its route emblem, or "bullet", is colored  since it uses the IRT Broadway–Seventh Avenue Line through most of Manhattan.

The 3 operates at all times. Daytime service operates between 148th Street in Harlem, Manhattan and New Lots Avenue in East New York, Brooklyn, making express stops in Manhattan and all stops in Brooklyn. Late night service short turns at Times Square–42nd Street in Midtown Manhattan.

The 3 train formerly ran to City Hall or South Ferry in Manhattan, and was later rerouted to Flatbush Avenue–Brooklyn College in Brooklyn. In 1983, it was rerouted to New Lots Avenue.

Service history

Early history 

On November 23, 1904, the IRT Lenox Avenue Line opened between 96th Street and 145th Street. 3 trains ran between 145th Street and City Hall, making all stops.

On July 1, 1918, the entire IRT Broadway–Seventh Avenue Line was completed. 3 trains were rerouted south of 42nd Street from the IRT Lexington Avenue Line to this new line. They now made all stops to South Ferry.

As of 1934, 3 service operated between 145th Street and South Ferry except late nights, when service operated between 145th Street and 96th Street, making local stops.

Under the New York City Transit Authority 
On January 3, 1955, late night two-car shuttle service between 145th Street and 96th Street, between 12:12 and 6:57 a.m. was discontinued due to low ridership. As a result, 145th Street was closed overnight. In addition, some 3 trains started running express in Manhattan during rush hours. These trains were extended to Flatbush Avenue; a few layups and put-ins ran to New Lots Avenue. However, from December 20, 1957, 3 trains were rerouted to New Lots Avenue during rush hours. On February 6, 1959, all trains except late nights made express stops in Manhattan as part of the "West Side Improvement" and ran to Flatbush Avenue.

Starting April 8, 1960, 3 trains were rerouted from Flatbush Avenue to New Lots Avenue, and weekday evening service between 9 p.m. and 1 a.m. was cut to a shuttle between 145th Street and 135th Street. Before the change, 3 trains had run between 145th Street and Flatbush Avenue between about 5:30 a.m. and 12:45 a.m. on weekdays and Saturdays, and from about 7:15 a.m. to 12:45 a.m. on Sundays. This service had been supplemented by additional service to and from New Lots Avenue.

However, on April 18, 1965, 3 service started to run to Flatbush Avenue again. On October 17, 1965, weekend evening service was also cut to a shuttle between 145th Street and 135th Street.

On May 13, 1968, trains were extended to the newly completed 148th Street–Lenox Terminal. Later that year, on November 12, late night shuttle service was implemented between 148th Street and 135th Street. On May 23, 1976, the current practice of starting Sunday service late (9 or 10 a.m.) began.

These changes were made to reduce non-revenue subway car mileage, to provide a dedicated fleet for each service, and to provide an easily accessible inspection yard for each service. The change allowed the 2 to be dedicated to 239th Street Yard and allowed the 3 to be assigned to Livonia Yard. With the rerouting of 3 trains, train lengths along the New Lots Line were reduced from 10 cars to 9 cars, within acceptable crowding levels, and train lengths along the Nostrand Avenue Line were increased from 9 to 10 cars, reducing crowding.

Beginning on August 5, 1990, late-night shuttles between 148th Street and 135th Street were discontinued and replaced by shuttle buses. On September 4, 1994, late-night shuttles between 148th Street and 135th Street were resumed, but were discontinued again on September 10, 1995. This was a cost-saving measure due to low ridership.

From March 2 to October 12, 1998, the IRT Lenox Avenue Line was rehabilitated. Most 3 service was rerouted to 137th Street–City College.

Recent history 
After September 11, 2001, the 3 service became a local in Manhattan. After a few switching delays at 96th Street, service was changed on September 19, 2001. It ran in Manhattan as an express between Harlem–148th Street and 14th Street and was replaced by  service in Brooklyn. Service returned to New Lots Avenue on September 15, 2002.

On July 27, 2008, late night 3 service was restored, operating express between 148th Street and Times Square–42nd Street. In addition, late morning weekday service was increased from running every 6 to 8 minutes to running every 5 to 7 minutes to reduce crowding on the 2. These increases were made as part of an $8.9 million package of systemwide service enhancements.

The Clark Street Tube underwent planned repairs on weekends from June 17, 2017 to June 24, 2018 due to Hurricane Sandy-related damage. The 3 operated only in Manhattan between Harlem-148th Street and 14th Street with 4 trains providing service in Brooklyn.

On November 17, 2019, New York City Transit cut weekday evening 3, 4 and 5 service in order to accommodate planned subway work. This change, which was approved by the MTA Board on June 27, 2019, started late night 3 service to Times Square an hour earlier, at 10:30 p.m. instead of 11:30 p.m. To replace 3 service, 4 service was extended to New Lots Avenue. These changes in service were expected to save the agency $900,000 annually.

Route

Service pattern 
The following table shows the lines used by the 3, with shaded boxes indicating the route at the specified times:

Stations 

For a more detailed station listing, see the articles on the lines listed above.

References

External links 
 
 MTA NYC Transit – 3 Seventh Avenue Express
 
 

New York City Subway services